Silvio Favero (31 August 1966 – 13 March 2021) was a Brazilian politician. He served as a member of the Legislative Assembly of Mato Grosso.

Biography
Born in Umuarama, Favero earned a law degree after working as a bricklayer, marketer, and office assistant. In 2018, he was elected as a state deputy for Mato Grosso after earning 12,059 votes. As a deputy, he introduced a bill against compulsory vaccination for COVID-19.

Silvio Favero died of COVID-19 in Cuiabá on 13 March 2021, at the age of 54.

References

1966 births
2021 deaths
21st-century Brazilian politicians
People from Umuarama
Deaths from the COVID-19 pandemic in Mato Grosso
Brazilian Democratic Movement politicians
Green Party (Brazil) politicians
Christian Labour Party politicians
Democrats (Brazil) politicians
Podemos (Brazil) politicians
Social Liberal Party (Brazil) politicians
Members of the Legislative Assembly of Mato Grosso